William James Yancey (April 2, 1902 – April 13, 1971) was an American baseball shortstop in the Negro leagues. He played from 1927 to 1936. He also played for the New York Renaissance, an all-black professional basketball team. Yancey also served as a Major League scout for the New York Yankees and Philadelphia Phillies.

References

External links
 and Baseball-Reference Black Baseball stats and Seamheads
Negro League Baseball Players Association

1902 births
1971 deaths
Baseball players from Pennsylvania
New York Renaissance players
Brooklyn Eagles players
Hilldale Club players
Lincoln Giants players
New York Black Yankees players
New York Cubans players
Philadelphia Quakers players
Philadelphia Stars players
Philadelphia Tigers players
Major League Baseball scouts
20th-century African-American sportspeople
Baseball infielders